Ryu Man-hyong (born 8 January 1941) is a North Korean long-distance runner. He competed in the marathon at the 1972 Summer Olympics.

References

1941 births
Living people
Athletes (track and field) at the 1972 Summer Olympics
North Korean male long-distance runners
North Korean male marathon runners
Olympic athletes of North Korea
Place of birth missing (living people)